Christian Huck (1747/8-1780) was a Loyalist soldier from Philadelphia during the American Revolutionary War known for Huck's Defeat.

Before the War

Christian Huck was born in a German State of Europe in approximately 1747/1748. Sometime within the time of his life before the Revolution began (possibly but unconfirmed in 1772), Huck immigrated to America and studied law there. Huck was "reading" law under Isaac Hunt, "A Philadelphia pamphleteer, satirist, and lawyer before the outbreak of the Revolution." He was settled in Philadelphia as an attorney at law by 1775; buying and selling real estate for "ready money or short credit, on very low terms, giving security." As a wealthy, German Anglican, Christian Huck fit right in as a member of Philadelphia's upper society, many of whom were loyal to the crown from the beginning of the War through to the bitter end.

The Revolution Begins

From the beginning of the War until his death in 1780, Christian Huck was a Loyalist. As the colonists' unrest grew, Huck remained loyal and when the War officially began, his and other prominent Philadelphians were rewarded for that loyalty with Whig harassment. Vandalism, public humiliation, and ostracism were common occurrences, even effecting Huck's mentor Isaac Hunt who was paraded through town and forced to admit and acknowledge his "misbehavior." Huck stayed in Philadelphia throughout these hardships, continuing to work, selling and purchasing real estate.

He contributed whenever he could to the Tory cause, associating and helping members who were targeted for their loyalty, and when the British Army occupied Philadelphia in September 1777, Christian Huck offered his assistance. It is unclear however, as to whether or not this required him to march against his neighbors but in 1778 the Pennsylvania Supreme Court published a list titled "A Proclamation, by the Supreme Executive Council of the Common Wealth of Pennsylvania."  Each person on the list was accused of "severally [adhering] to, and knowingly and willingly [aiding] and [assisting] the enemies of the State, and of the United States of America, by having joined their armies at Philadelphia, in the County of Philadelphia, within this State," including "Christian Hook, attorney at law." It was required that each person listed would be required to give up all property by a certain day would be considered as having committed High Treason and would be treated accordingly, including all "pains and penalties." It was also noted "all the faithful subjects of this State are to take notice of this Proclamation, and govern themselves accordingly."

Military career

Huck joined the British Army at New York by June 1778, succeeded in raising a company of thirty men for provincial duty, and received a captain's commission in a Provincial corps mainly consisting of men of German ancestry (including the commander, Major Andreas Emmerick). By this time Huck is 30 years old. The corps participated in several battles in 1777 and 1778 respectively, distinguishing a name for themselves by participating in the Hudson Highland Campaign, Kingsbridge frontline skirmishes, and the Battle of Monmouth. In 1778 the corps was supplemented by new recruits and had grown to include; "two troops of light dragoons, one infantry company, one rifle company, and three chasseur companies, one of which was Huck's." 
     Due to tensions within the corps between American and the British born members, the corps was split and one light dragoon troop was given to Huck to attach to (but not incorporated into) the British Legion under Lieutenant Colonel Banastre Tarleton. However the "attachment vs. incorporation" order had been apparently discarded by 1779's end as Huck's troops were routinely referred to as "of the Legion." In May 1780, Huck participated in the infamous Battle of the Waxhaws, led by Tarleton. He was also involved in the destruction of Hill's Ironworks, an important Patriot supplier as well as headquarters for Hill's Militia.

By July 1780, Huck was known for fighting in the Backcountry under the nickname "the swearing captain" due to his notoriety for profanity. Huck showed "particular enmity to Presbyterians" most likely due to Whigs in Philadelphia often being Presbyterian, therefore reminding Huck of those that harassed and accused him of treason who had caused him to seek retribution for his lost property. Charged with recruiting supporters for the Loyalist cause by Cornwallis, Huck ravaged through the Backcountry, threatening and plundering civilians, destroying properties, and making a name of cruelty for himself as well as his men. In one such instance, Huck ordered Martha Bratton (wife of Colonel William Bratton, and ardent Whig) to betray her husband's location and when refused she was threatened with a reaping hook. Only intervention from another officer spared her.

The Battle of Huck's Defeat

Continuing on his path after threatening Martha Bratton, Christian Huck went to the Williamson Plantation in York County, South Carolina. After capturing five Whig supporters at the plantation in the corncrib, Huck and his other officers stayed in the main house while the 115-20 men of his force set up camp in the surrounding areas. Believing that since they met no obstacle in overtaking the plantation they were safe, there was little to no guard posted. Little did Huck or his men know but Martha Bratton had sent a loyal slave named Watt to her husband (who was currently camped on Fishing Creek) to tell him where Huck was camped while a crippled spy named Joseph Kerr found Colonel Bratton as well. Combining Kerr and Watt's intelligence the attack on Huck's men was planned by Bratton and Captain John McClure, who was also with him.

At daybreak on July 12, 1780, the patriot forces advanced on Huck's slumbering encampment. There were somewhere between 140 and 250 Whigs in the attack. The battle was brief and many of Huck's men ran away into the woods after Huck was shot from his horse; the Whigs tracked down and killed the men from Christian Huck's forces that had bolted into the woods and later reports state that up to approximately 85 percent of the British supporters were killed, wounded, or captured in this battle that literally only lasted minutes while the Americans only had one man killed and another wounded. Huck was buried on the spot and his body later used as a medical skeleton.

Significance

The significance of the Battle of Huck's Defeat lied not in the strategic advancements of the Patriot cause, which were almost inconsequential, but in the psychological effects. The Whigs had been so downtrodden from recent losses that many of them were beginning to accept the inevitability of renewed British rule. After winning however, the thought of a Patriot militia group so decidedly defeating a trained British regiment that included members of the British Legion, so inspired the Patriots that they were able to rally once again behind their cause for liberty and with renewed energy continued resisting the British attacks and skirmishes. 
This renewed energy for the rebel cause would ultimately change the outcome of the war. The legacy that Christian Huck left behind was not one of Loyalist bravery, but of the "disgrace and defeat" that comes from neglect of proper duty which had caused his death. Huck lost the battle that won the rebels the War.

References

Bibliography

"Battle of Huck's Defeat." Culture & Heritage Museums. Accessed January 14, 2015. http://www.chmuseums.org/battle-of-hucks-defeat-hb/.

Bellesiles, Michael. "Christian Huck." Encyclopedia of the American Revolution: Library of Military History. Ed. Harold E. Selesky. Detroit: Charles Scribner's Sons, 2006. Biography in Context. Web. 14 Jan. 2015.

Cann, Katherine Davis, and George D. Fields Jr. Turning Point: The American Revolution in the Spartan District. Spartanburg, SC: Hub City Press, 2014.

Pennsylvania Gazette (Philadelphia) 12 April 1775.

Pennsylvania Packet, (Philadelphia) 13 May 1778.

Scoggins, Michael C. The Day It Rained Militia: Huck's Defeat and the Revolution in the South Carolina Backcountry, May–July 1780. Charleston, SC: History Press, 2005.

Tarleton, Banastre. "A  History of the Capmaigns of 1780 and 1781 in the Southern Provinces of North America." North Stratford, NH: Ayer Company, 1999 (originally published London: T. Cadell, 1787).

Walker, Melissa. The Battles of Kings Mountain and Cowpens: The American Revolution in the Southern Backcountry. New York, NY: Routledge, 2013.

1740s births
Loyalists in the American Revolution from Pennsylvania
Military personnel from Philadelphia
British military personnel killed in the American Revolutionary War
1780 deaths